The 2005 Asian Athletics Championships were the 16th edition of the international athletics competition between Asian nations. It was held in Incheon, South Korea between 1–4 September 2005.

Results

Men 

 The original bronze medalist, Anil Kumar, was disqualified for doping.

Women

Medal table

Participating nations

 (2)
 (2)
 (2)
 (50)
 (22)
 (12)
 (41)
 (5)
 (11)
 (7)
 (69)
 (33)
 (13)
 (7)
 (1)
 (4)
 (6)
 (16)
 (1)
 (2)
 (7)
 (6)
 (7)
 (14)
 (17)
 (22)
 (11)
 (63)
 (28)
 (4)
 (3)
 (26)
 (2)
 (9)
 (11)

See also 
 2005 in athletics (track and field)

References

 GBR Athletics
 Full results

 
Asian Athletics Championships
Asian Championships
Athletics
2005 in Asian sport
Sports competitions in Incheon
International athletics competitions hosted by South Korea